Bishop Stopford's School, commonly known as Bishop Stopford's, or (simply) just Bishop's, is a voluntary aided co-educational secondary school specialising in mathematics, computing and engineering, with a sixth form.  It is a London Diocesan Church of England school with worship in a relatively High Church Anglo-Catholic tradition.   It is in Brick Lane, Enfield, near Enfield Highway, Greater London, England.

Overview
Bishop Stopford's has about 920 pupils aged 11 to 19. In 2004 the school received an award for mathematics and computing and in 2008 engineering specialist status.

Key Stage 3
At Key Stage 3 pupils follow the same subjects for years 7–9. All pupils start to take French in Year 7.

GCSE
In Year 9 pupils can choose what subjects they wish to take for their GCSEs. All pupils take maths, science, English language, English literature, religious education, and physical education.

Sixth form
Entry to the Sixth Form is subject to a satisfactory report from the Year 11 Head of House and an interview with the Head of the Sixth Form or other relevant teacher. In the sixth form, pupils again choose what they wish to study. There are two routes which they may take. Pupils may take a 1-year BTEC course in either OCR business studies or BTEC art and design, or AS/A2 levels. The conditions for taking AS/A2 Levels are:

 a minimum of 5 A* to C grades at GCSE level in a suitable combination of subjects, and C grades or better in English Language, Literature, and Maths.
 a recommendation from the appropriate head of department.

History
After almost a century of attempts by the Church to found a church secondary school in Enfield, Bishop Stopford's was founded on St. Polycarp's Day 1967 and opened its doors to its first pupils on 7 September 1967. Its founder was the then Bishop of London, the Right Reverend Robert Wright Stopford. The school was founded to provide an Anglican church school for the children of Enfield, who at that time had several Church primary schools but no Church secondary school. The school was established in the buildings of the old Suffolk's Secondary Modern School.

The school hit the headlines in February 1990 when three rottweiler dogs escaped from a nearby property and entered the school premises and attacked and injured several pupils. The incident became known as the 'St. Valentine's Day Massacre' among pupils at the time, and was a contributing factor in the introduction of the Dangerous Dogs Act (1991). Former pupil, comedian Russell Kane described the experience in his 2019 memoir, Son of a Silverback.

The former Heads of Bishop Stopford's have been Dr Geoffrey Roberts B.A. PhD F.R.S.A, JP from 1967 to 1988 d. 2005, Brian Robin Pickard M.A. from 1988 to 2001 d. 2015, Mrs Bridget Sarah Evans from 2001 to 2008, ( Mrs E. Kohler was acting Head from May 2008 - July 2009) and Jim Owen from 2009 to 2012.

Mrs Tammy Day (Current Deputy Head /Senior Mistress) was appointed as Acting Head for a term until Mr Paul Woods assumed office in January 2013. During this time Mrs Sandra Melhuish (Assistant Head) was appointed as Acting Senior Mistress/Deputy Head and Mr Russell Dean (Assistant Head) was appointed Senior Master/Deputy Head and they both have the right to sign the School Roll again.

Mr Paul Woods assumed office as Head Master in January 2013 and resigned in 2015 leaving Ms T. Day as acting Head.

Mrs Tammy Day was appointed permanent Head in February 2017.

Houses
Each pupil and member of staff belongs to one of six Houses:

The Four Foundation Houses:
The House of the Resurgent City and Cathedral Church of St. Michael and all Angels at Coventry
The House of Saint George the Martyr, Great Patron of England
The House of Alfred The Great, King of the West Saxons
The House of William Temple, Head Master, Archbishop and Servant of GodThe Two Newer HousesThe House of the Holy Cross of our Saviour at Waltham
The House of the Holy, Blessed and Glorious Trinity

Each house has its own colour:
 Coventry - Green
 St. Georges - Red
 King Alfreds - Gold
 Temples - Pale Blue
 Waltham - Purple
 Trinity - Royal Blue

In September 2006 the new intake, year 7, had colours added to their ties. A coloured diagonal stripe denotes their year group.  Below this is a stripe in the House colours (for King Alfred's a shade of gold). Ensuing years have a year colour, with their House colour below it. The new tie also features the Bishop's Crozier symbol of the school. In September 2007 the new intake, year 7, had a blue stripe added to their ties. From September 2013 the new intake, year 7, have a grey/silver stripe on their ties.

Choir Form
The Choir Form was founded in 1973 and takes boys and girls from all six Houses from year 7 to the sixth form.  (Year 7 pupils may volunteer for the Junior Choir.) While remaining members of their Houses, pupils in the Choir Form attend registration together, and sing in assembly, hymn practice, choir practice and compline together. They attend a residential singing week every year, which has been at Bradwell on Sea, Seasalter, Walsingham, and Winchester.  In 2004-5 the Choir Form was renamed the Music Form to incorporate a wider range of musical abilities and the modernisation of school worship.

Gallery

Areas
Various parts of the school include:

East Wing - Divinity, Music, Citizenship and Food Technology lessons take place here.
East Wing Extension - English and Technology lessons take place here.
West Wing - Languages (MFL),ICT and Textiles (DT) lessons take place here. There is also an Art Department situated near the West Wing.
Orchard Wing - Maths, History, Geography, Business and ICT lessons take place here (Citizenship may also be studied in this wing).
Jubilee Wing - Science lessons take place here.
Sports Hall/Gym - PE lessons take place here.
Sixth Form - Various lessons for Years 12/13 take place here. There is also a Common Room situated in this area.

Chaplain
Bishop Stopford's School has had three chaplains since 1967:   Rev. James Lowry B.D., Rev. Stephen Taylor BSc., and Rev. Antony Homer.  All have chosen to take the title "father".

As well as taking a major part in school religious occasions, the chaplain is much involved with the pastoral side of the school, having regular contact with the Senior Six, Heads of Houses and the Senior Leadership Team of the School.

Fr. Antony Homer left in February 2011 to join the Ordinariate of the Roman Catholic Church.  A lay chaplain, Jonathan Seabrook, was then appointed, who is an assistant head teacher with responsibility for religion and worship.  He is also head of divinity.

Assembly
All pupils must attend one assembly a week, normally with year group. The Sixth Form has its own assembly on Fridays.

The assembly at Bishop Stopford's School begins with organ music.  A House prefect from one of the Houses whose assembly is being held then leads in the procession of all the prefects from the two Houses.  Following the prefects are the senior staff, normally the Deputy Head Master and the Deputy Head Mistress.  Behind the Deputy Heads comes the Chaplain. who is then followed by the Head's prefects, who are followed by the Head.  Gowns are still worn but assemblies are now less formal and less religious than previously.

The School Chapel
The school chapel was formerly a small room on the first floor of the West Wing of the school, but is now in the vestibule accessed from the corridor between the East and West Wings, by the great hall. The Eucharist is said in the chapel every morning as is the Prayer For All Stopfordians. This is a special prayer for all those who have a connection with the school, living or dead.

The stage contains the great altar, said to be the largest mobile altar in the Diocese of London, which was borrowed by the Oxford Movement for use in the Royal Albert Hall in its 150th anniversary celebrations. The Altar is covered by one of four different Altar cloths of appropriate colours for the Church year, made by various teachers and pupils of the school.

School Organ
The school's pipe organ was made from the remains of a church organ salvaged from Sandylands Methodist Church in Morecambe, Lancashire. Bought for £400, the organ is now insured for several hundreds of thousands of pounds. A new console was added during its installation, and additional pipes were bought.  The case was rebuilt and new wiring and electric bellows installed. The motor for the blower was purchased from the Trinity College of Music. As with many cathedral organs, the dummy pipes at the front of the organ are purely decorative.

Several notable organists have given recitals on this instrument, including Carlo Curley, Peter Hurford, Stephen Darlington, Thomas Trotter, and John Scott.

Traditions
The school is noted for its traditions, many of which date from the time of the first Head Master.

The School Pilgrimage

Every year pupils from Years 7 to 10 undertake an eleven-mile (seventeen kilometre) sponsored walk known as the School Pilgrimage along the canal tow-path of the River Lea Navigation from Ware to Enfield Lock. Sums raised have contributed substantially to the school foundation fund. In 2009 the route was blocked and the Pilgrimage was completed by proxy (as has always been stated on the sponsor forms) a fortnight later.

The Beating of the Bounds
Every year, on Ascension Day, a group of pupils used to go round the boundaries of the school striking selected areas with special whips. This was based on the Anglo-Saxon practice of beating the bounds. This has since been modernised, but a special Ascension Day assembly is still held, remembering the practice.

Gowns
The school is notable as one of few in Britain still to require its prefects to wear gowns. In 2003, however, the new Head instituted blazers, with gowns now reserved for special occasions. The gowns vary in colour but all take the form of a sleeveless robe. House Prefects wear grey gowns, School Prefects wear royal blue and Senior Prefects navy blue. House Captains also wear navy blue. The most senior rank of prefects, the Senior VI, wear navy blue Senior Prefect gowns with a coloured stripe to signify their rank. The Deputy Head Boy and Girl have a thin purple stripe and the Head Boy and Girl have a thick purple stripe. The most senior and oldest rank of prefect, the Head Master's Prefects, have a thick red stripe on their gown.

ForgivenessForgiveness'' was an alternative to corporal punishment. An offending pupil was offered a choice between receiving a caning and performing "forgiveness". A pupil who chose forgiveness was made to carry out arduous tasks or physical exercise for approximately one hour, after which he was said to be 'forgiven'. To make the choice, the miscreant was presented with a pair of blue and a pair of black shorts. If he opted to be caned, he would select the blue shorts. If he chose the black shorts he would receive forgiveness. .

With the outlawing of corporal punishment in state schools in England in 1987, the "trial by shorts" procedure became defunct. In recent years Forgiveness has become less and less common.

Although corporal punishment is no longer practised, for a while the school displayed the old canes in the Great Hall and the Head Master's study.

The School Roll
Since the school was founded, every new pupil and teacher at the school has signed his or her name on the School Roll. Originally a single roll of paper, kept in a leather cylinder, it has now had to have additional paper added to the first roll and two new separate rolls (and cylinders) made to accommodate new names. The roll used to be carried in the procession every morning in Assembly, but since there are now three cylinders. On special occasions one of the three cylinders is carried to signify the roll's importance in the life of the school.

Notable staff 
Eddie Baily taught PE at the school.

Old Stopfordians 

 Jason Banton, footballer
 Anton Blackwood, footballer, Antigua and Barbuda national team
 Jonathan Obika, footballer,
 Shy FX, musician, jungle drum'n'bass pioneer
 Ruth Symes, children's author
 Chijindu Ujah athlete
 Paul Barber Former Director of Communications - English FA - Former Executive Director - Tottenham Hotspur FC, Former Chief Executive - Vancouver Whitecaps - Current Chief Executive - Brighton and Hove Albion FC.
Russell Kane, comedian and author

References

External links
 
 Partner school in Germany
 Friends Reunited Page

Enfield, London
Anglo-Catholic educational establishments
Educational institutions established in 1967
Secondary schools in the London Borough of Enfield
Church of England secondary schools in the Diocese of London
1967 establishments in England
Voluntary aided schools in London
Specialist maths and computing colleges in England
Specialist engineering colleges in England